Čiūteliai Wind Park is one of the largest wind park in Lithuania and the Baltic States. In 2014, the park generated more than 98 GWh.

References

External links

 Naujoji Energija official website

Wind farms in Lithuania
2012 establishments in Lithuania